Saša Dragin is former Minister of Agriculture, Forestry and Water Management in the Government of Serbia (2008-2011). He was previously the Minister of Environmental Protection.

Biography 
He was born in Sombor in 1972. He graduated in 1999 from the Faculty of Agriculture, University of Novi Sad and received an MSc in 2003, followed by a PhD in 2007.  From 2005 he was Vojvodina Deputy-Secretary of Agriculture, Water Management and Forestry. He is a founder of the International Organisation of Agriculture Students and a founder and President of Junior Chamber International (JCI) Novi Sad and former National President of JCI Serbia. He was President of ICPDR (International Commission for Danube Protection) in 2008-2009. He is married and has two daughters.

Dragin left the government in a government reshuffle in March 2011.

References

External links 
 https://web.archive.org/web/20110309004336/http://www.agropress.org.rs/video-galerija-9.html

1972 births
Living people
Politicians from Sombor
Democratic Party (Serbia) politicians
University of Novi Sad alumni
Government ministers of Serbia